The Julie Andrews Hour was a television variety series starring Julie Andrews that was produced by ATV and distributed by ITC Entertainment. It aired on the ABC network in the United States. Known as the Julie Andrews Show in the UK and aired on the ITV network.

In order to secure Andrews, Sir Lew Grade and ABC offered her a generous five-year contract which included not only Andrews starring in a weekly television variety show, but also allowing her to do films. In 1963, when another major star, Judy Garland, was signed to a weekly television variety series, it failed to catch on with the public. One of the main reasons for its demise was its constant change of format and the fact that critics and audiences felt that Garland was not shown off to her best advantage. In order to avoid that error, Andrews asked producer Nick Vanoff what the premise of the show would be about. Vanoff immediately answered her by saying "Julie Andrews ... without Julie Andrews there is no Julie Andrews Hour."

The premiere installment of the show was presented on Wednesday, 13 September 1972 at 10:00 P.M. ET. As a way of introducing Julie Andrews to the vast television audience, the entire hour of the first episode showcased the singer performing in musical numbers ranging from her years on Broadway (The Boy Friend, My Fair Lady, and Camelot) to her motion picture career (Mary Poppins, The Sound of Music, and Star!). Appearing with Andrews on this episode were impressionist Rich Little and comedienne Alice Ghostley (who had appeared with Andrews in the 1957 CBS live television version of Rodgers & Hammerstein's Cinderella). Both Little and Ghostley would become semi-regulars.

The series received unanimously rave reviews, unfortunately, its time slot proved to be daunting because it was up against the popular CBS detective series, Cannon. Another reason for the low ratings was that the lateness of the hour was not conducive to family viewing since children were in bed by that time. On Thanksgiving Eve, 22 November 1972, The Julie Andrews Hour devoted an entire episode saluting Walt Disney. To make it more of a "family special", ABC switched the time slot of The Julie Andrews Hour that night to 8:30 P.M. and The ABC Wednesday Movie Of The Week to 9:30 P.M. The ratings improved a little, so ABC then made a decision to alternate Andrews' time period each week. (One week it would be 10:00 P.M., and the next week it would be 8:30 P.M.) This continued until January 1973, when the series was moved to Saturday nights at 9:00 P.M. The ratings went from bad to worse, as Andrews' chief competition was The Mary Tyler Moore Show and The Bob Newhart Show (both highly rated series) on CBS. (Ironically, Moore had been Andrews' co-star in the 1967 hit film, Thoroughly Modern Millie.)

Andrews was nominated for a Golden Globe Award (for Best Actress In A Leading Role — Musical Or Comedy Series for the show); she lost out to Jean Stapleton in All in the Family.  When the 1972-1973 Emmy Award nominations were announced, The Julie Andrews Hour received an impressive ten nominations.

Despite this achievement plus the rave reviews, ABC announced it was cancelling the series after its 24th episode in April 1973. After Andrews completed the last installment of the program, she and her husband Blake Edwards left for Barbados to film The Tamarind Seed which was part of her contract agreement with ABC and ITC. In May, 1973, The Julie Andrews Hour went on to win seven Emmy Awards out of its ten nominations, including the Outstanding Variety Musical Series award given to the show's producers, Nick Vanoff and William O. Harbach, and the star.

In recognition of all the awards her show received and as a consolation to her series being cancelled, ABC and ITV offered Andrews five variety specials which were produced in England between 1973 and 1975, also under the auspices of Lew Grade. This was also arranged to help fulfill Andrews's five-year contract. However, after her fifth special aired in the spring of 1975, the contract was mutually dissolved. In the late 1970s and early 1980s, several edited episodes of The Julie Andrews Hour were shown on syndicated stations throughout the United States as "specials".

Musical themes
The show opened with an excerpt of the title song from The Sound of Music by Rodgers and Hammerstein. Andrews performed "Time Is My Friend" to close each episode. The music was written by Andrews with lyrics by her close friend Leslie Bricusse.

References

External links
 

Television series by ITC Entertainment
British variety television shows
Television shows produced by Associated Television (ATV)
American Broadcasting Company original programming
1970s British television series
1972 British television series debuts
1973 British television series endings
Primetime Emmy Award for Outstanding Variety Series winners
English-language television shows